Stephanie Beacham (born 28 February 1947) is an English television, film, radio and theatre actress.

Beacham began appearing on British television in 1967 and made her big screen debut in the 1970 film The Games, before starring opposite Marlon Brando in the 1971 film The Nightcomers. By the mid-1970s, Beacham had become widely known as a "scream queen" for her roles in multiple horror films including  Dracula A.D. 1972 (1972), Schizo (1976) and Inseminoid (1981), however after successful starring roles in Tenko (1981–1982) and Connie (1985), it was Beacham's role as Sable Colby in the ABC series Dynasty (1985–1989) and its spin-off The Colbys (1985–1987) that would make her a household name on both sides of the Atlantic. She subsequently starred in the films Troop Beverly Hills (1989), The Wolves of Willoughby Chase (1989) and the television series Sister Kate (1989–1990), for which she was nominated for a Golden Globe Award, and had main roles in the American teen sitcom Beverly Hills, 90210 (1991–1994) and the drama series No Bananas (1996).

Her television roles into the 20th century include Phyl Oswyn in the ITV prison-based drama series Bad Girls (2003–2006), Martha Fraser in the long-running ITV soap opera Coronation Street (2009, 2022–present), and Lorraine in the Sky One sitcom Trollied (2012), as well as venturing into reality television competing on Strictly Come Dancing (2007) and Celebrity Big Brother (2010). On stage, she starred as Maria Callas in a 2010 UK touring production of the play Master Class.

Early life
Beacham, one of four siblings, was born in Barnet, Hertfordshire, England, the daughter of Joan (née Wilkins), a housewife, and Alic, who was an insurance executive and the managing director of the Grosvenor estate. She attended Barnet's Queen Elizabeth's Girls' Grammar School and later travelled to Boulogne-Billancourt in Paris, France, to study mime with Étienne Decroux, before attending the Royal Academy of Dramatic Art (RADA) in London.

Career
Beacham's initial goal was to teach dance movement to deaf children, but she began a career in modelling and then began acting in television. Her first screen role was in the BBC series The Queen's Traitor in 1967, in which she played Mary, Queen of Scots. During an interview, thinking Barnet sounded uninteresting, she told a reporter from the Northern Echo she was born in Casablanca, where her favourite Bogart/Bergman film was set. After many further guest appearances in television series such as The Saint with Roger Moore, Callan, and UFO, Beacham's first film roles were in The Games directed by Michael Winner, and Tam Lin directed by Roddy McDowall, both released in 1970. She would work with Winner again in 1971's The Nightcomers, in which she starred opposite Marlon Brando. Beacham appeared nude in one scene, during the filming of which Brando wore Y-fronts and wellington boots under the bed clothes to ensure Winner did not film anything lower than was necessary. Horror would be a genre that Beacham appeared in often during this period, and she was subsequently cast as Jessica Van Helsing in Hammer's Dracula A.D. 1972 alongside Peter Cushing.

Beacham continued to appear in film, television and on stage. Her next role was as a repertory player with the Nottingham Playhouse, where she played several lead and feature roles, including the role of Nora in the Henrik Ibsen play A Doll's House. In 1973, she played Georgina Layton in Thames Television's daytime drama Marked Personal. The same year, she made an Italian film, Super Bitch The film was released in the US in 1977 as Mafia Junction and in the UK as Blue Movie Blackmail. Beacham also continued to work in horror films, including And Now the Screaming Starts (1973), House of Mortal Sin (1975), Schizo (1976) and Inseminoid (1981) – a film she admits taking for the fee.

From 1981 to 1982, Beacham featured as a member of the ensemble cast of the BBC series Tenko, about a group of women prisoners of war held captive by the Japanese after their invasion of Singapore in 1942. Following this, she continued working in theatre and television before landing the lead role in the 13-part ITV drama series Connie (1985). Her roles in Tenko and Connie helped to springboard her into one of her most well-remembered roles, that of the devious matriarch Sable Colby on the television series The Colbys (1985–1987). The Colbys was a spin-off of the opulent prime-time soap Dynasty which had been the highest rating programme in the USA that year. Beacham was cast opposite Charlton Heston as the tent-pole couple of the new show. The Colbys never experienced the success of its parent show and was cancelled after two seasons, though in 1988, Beacham was invited to reprise the role of Sable on Dynasty, playing opposite Joan Collins in a season-long "battle of the bitches" scenario; she then remained in the show until its end.

After Dynasty was cancelled in 1989, Beacham landed the lead role in the children's fantasy film The Wolves of Willoughby Chase, playing an evil governess. She was then cast in the US sitcom Sister Kate, taking the lead role as a nun taking care of children in an orphanage. The series lasted for one season and was cancelled in 1990, though she earned a Golden Globe nomination for the role. She then returned to Britain to play Mrs. Peacock in an ITV game show version of the board game Cluedo (1990). In 1990, Beacham starred in the television miniseries Lucky Chances, based on the book written by Jackie Collins. Reuniting with Dynasty producer Aaron Spelling, Beacham also had a recurring guest role in the popular teen drama Beverly Hills, 90210, playing Iris McKay, the estranged mother of Luke Perry's character Dylan. Beacham appeared in six different television series produced by Spelling, including Dynasty and its spin-off, The Colbys, The Love Boat, Beverly Hills, 90210, Burke's Law, and Charmed. 

In 1992, Beacham starred opposite Christopher Plummer in the film Secrets, and followed this with a role in the television series To Be the Best with Anthony Hopkins. In 1993, Beacham played Countess Regina Bartholomew in the Star Trek: The Next Generation episode "Ship in a Bottle". Later in 1993, Beacham signed on to play Dr. Kristin Westphalen in the NBC science fiction series seaQuest DSV, produced by Steven Spielberg. Her character was the chief oceanographer and medical doctor for the submarine seaQuest, however Beacham left the programme after its first season. Throughout the 1990s, she continued to make guest appearances on television programmes, working in both the UK and the US. Beacham was a judge on both Miss Universe 1994 and Miss World 2000. In 1995, Beacham starred in the play The Father alongside Edward Fox and in 1996, she starred in the BBC drama No Bananas which was set during World War II, and later appeared in the music video for Simply Red's single "Never Never Love" alongside Rula Lenska and Billie Whitelaw. For much of the remainder of the 1990s, Beacham appeared in roles in theatre; she played Mrs. Cheveley in a production of An Ideal Husband in Broadway in the US from 1996 to 1997 before embarking on a theatre tour of Australia in the same play and role in 1998. 

In 2002, Beacham played Elizabeth I in the play Elizabeth Rex at the Birmingham Repertory Theatre. Later that year she appeared in two American romantic comedy films: Unconditional Love and Would I Lie to You?. In 2003, Beacham returned to the UK to take a role in the ITV prison drama Bad Girls. She played inmate Phyllida "Phyl" Oswyn for four years, partnered with Beverly "Bev" Tull (played by Amanda Barrie) as the "Costa Cons". She remained with the series to the end in 2006. In 2006, she played the Wicked Witch in a production of Snow White and the Seven Dwarves in Guildford. She appeared there again the following year in a production of Jack and the Beanstalk. She also appeared in the 2006 movie Love and Other Disasters. She returned to stage work and toured the UK in 2007 as a lead in the Noël Coward play Hay Fever. Later that year, she competed in the 2007 series of the BBC's Strictly Come Dancing with professional partner Vincent Simone, though she was eliminated early in the competition (the second of fourteen celebrities) on 14 October 2007. In 2008, Beacham filmed scenes for Steven Berkoff's film, then known as Naked in London but later released as Moving Target.

In November 2008, it was announced that Beacham had joined the cast of ITV's Coronation Street portraying Martha Fraser, a love interest for Ken Barlow (played by William Roache). She made her first appearance on 26 January 2009, appearing in twenty-two episodes until her last appearance on 4 May 2009. Later in 2009, Beacham guest starred in an episode of the comedy series Free Agents.

In February 2010, Beacham appeared in the final episode of the BBC series Material Girl. In April 2010, she made a guest appearance in the long-running BBC hospital drama series Casualty. She then starred as Maria Callas in a UK tour of Master Class from 2010 to 2011. In January 2010, Beacham entered Channel 4's seventh and final series of Celebrity Big Brother as a housemate; she was the only female to make it to the final and finished in fifth place on 29 January 2010.

In October 2011, Beacham released her autobiography Many Lives, in which she discusses her life and career. The book includes a foreword written by her Coronation Street co-star William Roache. In 2012, Beacham reunited with her Dynasty co-star Joan Collins in a UK television advert for Snickers. She also appeared as store manager Lorraine Chain in Sky1's supermarket-based sitcom Trollied for eight episodes between August 2012 and October 2012. The same year, she also appeared in three episodes of Sky Living's Mount Pleasant as Aunty Pam, and in January 2013, Beacham guest starred in an episode of Death in Paradise. From 2014 to 2016 played Maureen in the BBC sitcom Boomers. She also starred in the film Wild Oats (2016) with Shirley MacLaine and Demi Moore.

In October 2016, Beacham starred as  Princess Margaret in the play A Princess Undone by Richard Stirling which premiered at the Cambridge Arts Theatre. In 2017, Beacham starred opposite Miriam Margolyes in the comedy series Bucket. In 2018, Beacham filmed a role in the television pilot Carol & Vinnie, directed by Dan Zeff, however it was not broadcast. In August 2018, Beacham took part in the television series The Real Marigold Hotel in which she and other celebrities including Susan George and Stanley Johnson tour around Udaipur in India exploring the Indian culture. In February 2021, Beacham's agent and novelist Melanie Blake announced plans to plans to launch a new British soap opera, Falcon Bay. She confirmed that Beacham would star in the soap if she secures the rights to the production. In October 2022, Beacham had a role in the action thriller film Renegades alongside Lee Majors, Danny Trejo and Patsy Kensit. In November 2022, it was announced that Beacham would reprise the role of Martha Fraser in Coronation Street. Her comeback episode was broadcast on 21 November 2022. In December 2022, Beacham guest-starred in an episode of Whitstable Pearl and played Elizabeth Hurley's mother in the Christmas romantic comedy film Christmas in the Caribbean.

Other ventures

Philanthropy and activism
In 2009, Beacham was involved in launching the Sense National Deafblind and Rubella Association Fill in the Gaps campaign which aims to give the elderly the support they need to maintain a good quality of life. She also attended the Parliamentary launch of the campaign in June 2006. Beacham is also a spokesperson for the American Speech–Language–Hearing Association, which supports those with communication disabilities, and is a member of the British Tinnitus Association, as well as being on the Board of Free Arts for Abused Children in Los Angeles which gives abused children access to the arts for therapeutic value.

In 2017, Beacham appeared in a promotional film for Unison, voicing her support for their Pay Up Now campaign, encouraging the British government to give public service workers a pay increase.

Business ventures
In 2009, Beacham launched her own range of skincare and beauty products, Glow by Stephanie Beacham. The range proved to be a bestseller, selling fifty thousand units within a month of launching.

Personal life
Beacham is partially deaf, having been born with no hearing in her right ear and 80% hearing in her left ear. She has said that this was partially caused by her mother having chicken pox while she was pregnant with her.

She married actor John McEnery in 1973; she became pregnant shortly after the wedding but suffered a miscarriage when she was three months pregnant. She revealed in an interview her stillborn son was cremated. Beacham and McEnery divorced in 1979. They have two daughters, Phoebe (b. 1974) and Chloe (b. 1977).

She dated Marlon Brando after starring with him in The Nightcomers (1971) and later had relationships with Eric Clapton and Imran Khan in the 1980s, then a cricketer, later a politician who became Prime Minister of Pakistan. Beacham is currently in a relationship with doctor Bernie Greenwood; the couple became engaged in 2013.

Beacham splits her time between homes in London, Malibu, Morocco and Spain.

Beacham was successfully treated for skin cancer in 2009. She had a recurrence of the disease in 2011 but has again recovered.

In March 2016, Beacham told The Sunday Telegraph that she had been raped when she had been an up-and-coming actress, in her twenties.

On 25 September 2022, Beacham was confronted by a crowbar-wielding burglar inside her London home who threatened and taunted her, raising the crowbar in a striking motion, forcing Beacham to hide in another room while he raided her home, stealing jewellery as well as Beacham's mobile phone, purse, bank cards, keys and chequebook before fleeing the property. Beacham described the incident as "terrifying", leaving her "having real fears for her life". The police who attended the scene described Beacham as "profoundly shaken" during the aftermath of the incident. Although Beacham was not required to attend the hearing at Southwark Crown Court in February 2023, it was revealed through her victim impact statement that she "no longer feels safe in her own home" and suffered from panic attacks and nightmares following the incident which left her struggling to learn her lines for acting work. The offender, who had sixty-four previous convictions, was jailed for a total of ten years and five months.

Filmography

Film

Television

Video games

Music videos

Theatre

Plays

Pantomime

Radio

Awards and nominations

Bibliography
 Many Lives, Hay House, 2011. .

References

External links

 
 
 
 Stephanie Beacham(Aveleyman)

Living people
20th-century English actresses
21st-century English actresses
Actresses from London
Alumni of RADA
Deaf actresses
English expatriates in the United States
English film actresses
English stage actresses
English television actresses
English radio actresses
People from Chipping Barnet
Actresses from Hertfordshire
English soap opera actresses
English deaf people
1947 births